Willesden was the name of a number of ships.
, built in 1944 by Caledon Shipbuilding, Dundee as Empire Canning
, built in 1961 by Barclay, Curle & Co Ltd, Glasgow

Ship names